The 1886 California Golden Bears football team was an American football team that represented the University of California, Berkeley during the 1886 college football season. The team competed as an independent under head coach Oscar S. Howard and compiled a record of 6–2–1.

Schedule

References

California
California Golden Bears football seasons
California Golden Bears football